Paras Chhabra (born 11 July 1990) is an Indian model, actor and reality television personality. He is known for winning MTV Splitsvilla 5 and for being a finalist in Bigg Boss 13.

Career
Chhabra started his career in 2012 by participating in MTV India's Splitsvilla 5 and emerged as the winner with Akanksha Popli. Next, he appeared in Channel V India's V The Serial opposite Sara Khan. In 2015, he participated in MTV India's Splitsvilla 8. In 2016, he played Tejinder Singh in &TV's Badho Bahu. In 2017, he portrayed Kaal Ketu in Star Plus's Aarambh. He went on to play Tommy Singh in Kaleerein, Duryodhan in Karn Sangini, Ravan in Vighnaharta Ganesha and Soham in Aghori. In September 2019, Chhabra participated in Colors TV's Bigg Boss 13. He emerged as a finalist and decided to walk out, opting for the cash prize of 10 lakhs. In 2020, he participated in Colors TV's Mujhse Shaadi Karoge along with Shehnaaz Gill.

Filmography

Television

Music videos

References

External links

Bigg Boss (Hindi TV series) contestants
Living people
Indian television actors
Indian soap opera actors
Indian male models
1990 births